The Suramadu Bridge, also known as the Surabaya–Madura Bridge, is a cable-stayed bridge between Surabaya on the island of Java and the town of Bangkalan on the island of Madura in Indonesia.  Opened in June 2009, the  bridge is the longest in Indonesia and the second longest in southern hemisphere. It is the first bridge to cross the Madura Strait.

The bridge has two lanes in each direction plus an emergency lane and a dedicated lane for motorcycles in each direction.

History

Early history

The idea of a bridge connecting Surabaya with Madura is said to have first been proposed in the early 1960s by the well-known Indonesian engineer Professor Sedyatmo from the Bandung Institute of Technology. Later, in the mid-1980s, there was renewed interest in the project when staff from the National Development Planning Bureau (Bappenas) met with Japanese aid donors to discuss construction of a bridge.  A pre-feasibility study was prepared in early 1990 and in December 1990, President Suharto appointed a team of ministers and advisers to consider plans for the bridge. Later, a consortium consisting on the Indonesian state-owned firm  and other Indonesian firms along with Japanese firms (Mitsubishi Corporation, Itochu, Shimizu, and the Long Term Credit Bank) was established to proceed with the bridge.

Further developments

In 1997-98, a range of problems arising from the Asian financial crisis in Indonesia led to suspension of activities. However within a few years the East Java Provincial Government took up a renewed interest in plans and in 2000 announced that further initiatives would be taken at the provincial level. These steps gained impetus when President Megawati issued a decree instructing ministers to take additional steps to support construction of the bridge and appointing PT Jasa Marga as the lead Indonesian firm for the project.

The bridge was built by a consortium of Indonesian companies PT Adhi Karya and PT Waskita Karya working with China Road and Bridge Corp. and China Harbor Engineering Co. Ltd.  The total cost of the project, including connecting roads, has been estimated at Rp4.5 trillion (US$445 million).

Construction began in August 2003. In July 2004, a girder collapsed, killing one worker and injuring nine others. Work on the bridge halted at the end of 2004 due to lack of funds, but was restarted in November 2005. The main span of the bridge was connected on 31 March 2009 and the bridge was opened to the public on 10 June 2009.

Within a week of the opening, it was discovered that nuts and bolts as well as maintenance lamps had been stolen and that there was evidence of vandalism of cables supporting the main span.

Tariffs

As is often the case with public sector infrastructure facilities in Indonesia, there has been pressure to keep the tariffs for use of the bridge low. Tolls were initially set at Rp30,000 (US$3 in 2009) for four-wheeled vehicles and Rp3,000 (US$0.30) for two-wheelers.  However, in early 2016, it was announced that President Jokowi favored a 50% cut in the tolls to help promote the competitiveness of industries on the Madura side of the bridge.

No details were available as to how the cuts in the tolls would be funded.  However, a spokesperson for the state-owned company PT Jasa Marga which operated the bridge said that the reductions in tariffs would not cause a problem for the operating firm itself because Jasa Marga was paid directly by the government to manage the bridge.

Starting 27 October 2018, toll tariffs were abolished for all types of vehicles.

References

Bridges completed in 2009
Bridges in Indonesia
Cable-stayed bridges in Indonesia
Buildings and structures in Surabaya
Buildings and structures in East Java
Madura Island
Transport in East Java